Temperature Rising may refer to:

Temperature Rising (album), a 2006 album by Tata Young
Temperature's Rising, an album by Loverboy
"Temperature's Rising" (song), a 1995 song by Mobb Deep from The Infamous
Temperatures Rising, an American television situation comedy